The Remington Model 742, also known as the Woodsmaster, is a semi-automatic rifle that was produced by Remington Arms from 1960 until 1980.

Design
It uses a straight 4-round magazine, a 10-round magazine, and a rare 20-round magazine. Features include a side ejection port and a free-floating barrel. It uses the same action as the Remington 1100 series shotguns, with both having the venerable 870 series as the parent gun.  In 1981, the Model 742 was replaced by the Model 7400, followed by the Remington Model 750. While these rifles are widely used and favoured by hunters, the extractor has been known to break if carbon build up occurs. This has given the model 742 rifle the nickname of a "jammy remmy".

References

Remington Arms firearms
Semi-automatic rifles of the United States